Edward P. Weed (April 7, 1834 – April 18, 1880) was Warden of the Borough of Norwalk, Connecticut from 1867 to 1868, and in 1874 until his resignation. He also served as a member of the Connecticut House of Representatives from Norwalk in the sessions of 1874, and 1878.

He was born in Norwalk on April 7, 1834, the son of John Adams Weed and Emeline Chichester.

References 

1834 births
1880 deaths
Mayors of Norwalk, Connecticut
Democratic Party members of the Connecticut House of Representatives
19th-century American politicians